Gaslight is a 1944 American psychological thriller film directed by George Cukor, and starring Charles Boyer, Ingrid Bergman, Joseph Cotten and Angela Lansbury in her film debut. Adapted by John Van Druten, Walter Reisch, and John L. Balderston from Patrick Hamilton's play Gas Light (1938), it follows a young woman whose husband slowly manipulates her into believing that she is descending into insanity.

A remake of the 1940 British film of the same name directed by Thorold Dickinson, Cukor's version had a larger scale and budget than the earlier film, and lends a different feel to the material. To avoid confusion with the first film, Cukor's version was originally titled The Murder in Thornton Square in the UK. The film features numerous deviations from the original stage play, though the central drama remains that of a husband trying to drive his wife insane in order to distract her from his criminal activities.

Gaslight was released theatrically on May 4, 1944, by Metro-Goldwyn-Mayer to critical acclaim and box-office success, grossing $4.6 million on a $2 million budget, and received seven nominations for the 17th Academy Awards, including for the Best Picture, winning two: Best Actress (for Bergman), and Best Production Design. In 2019, the film was selected for preservation in the United States National Film Registry by the Library of Congress as being "culturally, historically, or aesthetically significant".

Plot
In 1875, when world-famous opera singer Alice Alquist is murdered at her London home, her niece Paula is sent to Italy to follow in her footsteps. As an adult, Paula marries her accompanist Gregory Anton, after a two-week whirlwind romance. At his suggestion, they settle in London and occupy her late aunt's long-vacant townhouse.

Paula grapples with the memory of her aunt's murder, and Gregory suggests storing Alice's furnishings in the attic. When Paula finds a letter to her aunt from a man named Sergis Bauer, Gregory reacts violently but apologizes. He hires a young maid, Nancy, and insists that she never bother his "high-strung" wife.

Paula is surprised when Gregory chides her supposed forgetfulness, but on a visit to the Tower of London, she cannot find an heirloom brooch he gave her, although it was stored safely in her handbag. She is plagued by noises coming from the boarded-up attic, and notices the gaslights dim for no apparent reason when Gregory is not home, which he assures her is only her imagination.

Gregory flirts with Nancy, whose disdain for his wife only worsens Paula's nerves. Her anxious behavior is noticed by Inspector Brian Cameron of Scotland Yard, a childhood admirer of Alice. Struck by Paula's resemblance to her aunt, Cameron attempts to reopen the cold case, discovering that a gift of royal jewels was not recovered after Alice's murder.

Isolating his wife from the world, Gregory convinces her that she is a kleptomaniac, responsible for hiding a painting, and is too unwell to be in public. Unable to prevent her from attending a party hosted by her old family friend, Gregory accuses Paula of stealing his watch. When he finds it in her handbag, Paula becomes hysterical in front of the guests. Taking Paula home, Gregory angrily claims that her mother died in an asylum, and that the letter she discovered from Sergis Bauer never existed. Doubting her own sanity, Paula breaks down.

Suspicious, Cameron recruits a patrolman to watch Gregory, who they learn often visits an abandoned house nearby, and is planning to institutionalize Paula. When Gregory leaves, Cameron offers Paula his help, confirming that the attic noises and flickering gaslights are indeed real. He deduces that Gregory goes to the neighboring vacant house to enter his own attic through a skylight. Paula has heard him searching through Alice's belongings, and the gaslights flicker when he turns on the attic lights, reducing the gas to the downstairs lamps.

Cameron pries open Gregory's desk, and Paula finds the letter from Bauer that her husband insisted was a delusion. They realize "Gregory" is actually Sergis Bauer, who murdered Alice but was interrupted before he could find her jewels. His marriage to Paula was a scheme to gain access to her aunt's home, followed by a cunning strategy to drive his wife mad and have her institutionalized, leaving him Alice's estate and allowing him to search unabated for the jewels.

In the attic, Sergis discovers the jewels hidden in plain sight, sewn into one of Alice's famous costumes. He returns downstairs to find his desk unlocked, and a mentally exhausted Paula admits that she was visited by a man. To protect Paula, the kindly cook Elizabeth assures Sergis that this was merely a figment of her imagination, driving Paula to despair. Cameron appears and confronts Sergis, chasing him into the attic and tying him to a chair.

Finally convinced of her own sanity, Paula is left alone with Sergis, who urges her to cut him free. Instead, Paula taunts him, musing that the knife in her hand might not be real and finding the "missing" brooch. As the police drive Sergis away, Cameron expresses interest in seeing Paula again.

Cast

Production 
Encouraged by the success of the play and the British 1940 film, Metro-Goldwyn-Mayer bought the remake rights, but with a clause insisting that all existing prints of the first film be destroyed, even to the point of trying to destroy the negative. Evidently that order was not honored to the letter, since the 1940 Gaslight remains available for both theatrical exhibition, television screenings, and DVD release.

Denominalization of the play's title 

Self-help and popular psychology authors sometimes denominalize the film's title (also known as "verbing") and use it as a verb. Gaslighting, in this context, refers to manipulating a person or a group of people, in a way similar to the way the protagonist in the film was manipulated.

Reception

Box office
According to MGM records the film earned $2,263,000 in the US and Canada and $2,350,000 in other markets resulting in a profit of $941,000.

Critical response

Alongside the original 1940 British film, critics generally consider the American remake to also be a classic. Bergman's Oscar-winning performance has long been considered among the best to win Best Actress, while Boyer's portrayal of Gregory was also Oscar nominated. On Rotten Tomatoes the film has an approval rating of 89% based on reviews from 35 critics.

When Gaslight was released, The New York Times film critic Bosley Crowther praised the actors. He wrote, "And with Mr. Boyer doing the driving in his best dead-pan hypnotic style, while the flames flicker strangely in the gas-jets and the mood music bongs with heavy threats, it is no wonder that Miss Bergman goes to pieces in a most distressing way. Both of these popular performers play their roles right to the hilt. Nice little personality vignettes are interestingly contributed, too, by Joseph Cotten as a stubborn detective, Dame May Whitty and Angela Lansbury as a maid."

Noir analysis
In 2006, film critic Emanuel Levy discussed the film noir aspects of the film:

A thriller soaked in paranoia, Gaslight is a period films  noir that, like Hitchcock's The Lodger and Hangover Square, is set in the Edwardian age. It's interesting to speculate about the prominence of a film cycle in the 1940s that can be described as 'Don't Trust Your Husband'. It began with three Hitchcock films: Rebecca (1940), Suspicion (1941), and Shadow of a Doubt (1943), and continued with Gaslight and Jane Eyre (both in 1944), Dragonwyck (1945), Notorious and The Spiral Staircase (both 1946), The Two Mrs. Carrolls (1947), and Sorry, Wrong Number and Sleep, My Love (both 1948). All of these films use the noir visual vocabulary and share the same premise and narrative structure: The life of a rich, sheltered woman is threatened by an older, deranged man, often her husband. In all of them, the house, usually a symbol of sheltered security in Hollywood movies, becomes a trap of terror.

Accolades

The film is recognized by the American Film Institute in the following lists:
AFI's 100 Years...100 Thrills – #78

See also 
 List of American films of 1944
 Gothic romance film
 Gaslighting

References

External links

 
 
 
 
 
 
  April 29, 1946, on Lux Radio Theatre, 60 minutes, with Ingrid Bergman and Charles Boyer (MP3)

1944 films
1940s mystery thriller films
1940s psychological thriller films
American black-and-white films
American films based on plays
American mystery thriller films
American psychological thriller films
American remakes of British films
1940s English-language films
Film noir
Films directed by George Cukor
Films featuring a Best Actress Academy Award-winning performance
Films featuring a Best Drama Actress Golden Globe-winning performance
Films scored by Bronisław Kaper
Films set in London
Films set in the 19th century
Films whose art director won the Best Art Direction Academy Award
Metro-Goldwyn-Mayer films
United States National Film Registry films
1940s American films
Films with screenplays by John L. Balderston